The Sorts are a primarily instrumental post-rock band based in Washington, D.C. and formed in 1994 by Josh LaRue (guitar, vocals), Stuart Fletcher (bass) and Chris Farrall (drums).  LaRue, Fletcher and Farrall comprised the band's core, appearing on all recordings, but they have been joined on several releases by Carlo Cennamo (sax), Vin Novara (keyboards) and Joseph P. McRedmond (guitar).

Discography

Albums

Common Time (1996)
This is Gateway Sounds (Spring, 1997)
More There (Slowdime Records, 1998)
Hawaiian Bronco (Aesthetics, 1999)
Contemporary Music (Slowdime Records, 1999)
Six Plus (Luckyhorse Industries, 2003)

Singles

"How Did You Get There?" (Southern Records, 1997)

Related Bands
Admiral - Joseph McRedmond
The Boom - Chris Farrall, Josh LaRue
The Crownhate Ruin - Joseph McRedmond, Vin Novara
Hoover - Chris Farrall, Joseph McRedmond
Rain Like the Sound of Trains - Josh LaRue
Sea Tiger - Chris Farrall, Stuart Fletcher, Josh LaRue, Joseph McRedmond
Sevens - Chris Farrall, Josh LaRue

References

External links
The Sorts catalog and band overview on Epitonic
The Sorts on Last.fm
The Sorts catalog on Luckyhorse Industries
The Sorts catalog on Southern Records
Band biography  by Jason Ankeny at [ All Music Guide]
Review of More There by Nitsuh Abebe at [ All Music Guide]
Review of Contemporary Sounds by John Vallier at [ All Music Guide]
Review of "How Did You Get There?" on Hardcore for Nerds
Review of Common Time and More There on Zen and the Art of Face Punching

American post-rock groups
Musical groups from Washington, D.C.